Xantusia sanchezi, Sanchez's night lizard,  is a species of lizard in the family Xantusiidae. It is a small lizard found in Mexico.

References

Xantusia
Endemic reptiles of Mexico
Reptiles described in 1999
Taxa named by Robert L. Bezy